

Composition

Committees
There were 13 committees for the years 2013-17.

Members of the Punjab Legislative Assembly elected in 2012
The following is the list of the members elected in 2012 to the Punjab assembly:

Next Elections 
Punjab Legislative Assembly election, 2017 to be held for electing 15th Punjab Legislative Assembly

References

14th
2012 establishments in Punjab, India